Kalateh-ye Nuri; also simply Nuri, may refer to:
 Kalateh-ye Nuri, Razavi Khorasan
 Kalateh-ye Nuri, South Khorasan